Rondoniense Social Clube, commonly referred to as Rondoniense, is a Brazilian football club based in Porto Velho, Rondônia. The club competes in the Campeonato Rondoniense Série A, the top division in the Rondônia state football league system.

Currently, Rondoniense is the seventh-best ranked team from Rondônia in CBF's national club ranking, being placed 238th overall.

History
The club was founded initially in 2007, through an important social project created with the goal of using sports to promote inclusion and social integration of children and adolescents. This project, created and maintained by its founder Antônio Tadeu de Oliveira. The site, which previously served as a recreation for your family, turned into a training center composed of three officers. The project, which before served to promote inclusion and social wellbeing and the modernized only and exclusively social bias and now has a methodology for sports initiation and training of athletes. The became officially professional on 1 March 2010.

Stadium
Rondoniense play their home games at Estádio Aluízio Ferreira. The stadium has a maximum capacity of 7,000 people.

Honours
Campeonato Rondoniense: 1
2016

References

External links
 Official Site

Association football clubs established in 2007
Rondoniense
Porto Velho
2007 establishments in Brazil